The Italy women's national under-17 football team represents Italy in international football in under-17 categories and is controlled by the Italian Football Federation.

FIFA U-17 Women's World Cup record

UEFA Women's Under-17 Championship

See also
Italy women's national football team
Italy women's national under-19 football team

References

External links

Women's national under-17 association football teams
U17
European women's national under-17 association football teams